England House may refer to:
(sorted by state, then city/town)

Abner Elliot England-Guy Hidden Lawrence House, Phoenix, Arizona, listed on the National Register of Historic Places (NRHP) in Maricopa County, Arizona
England House (Little Rock, Arkansas), listed on the NRHP in Pulaski County, Arkansas
French-England House, Little Rock, Arkansas, listed on the NRHP in Pulaski County, Arkansas
Joseph E. England, Jr., House, North Little Rock, Arkansas, listed on the NRHP in Pulaski County, Arkansas
England House and Mill, Newark, Delaware, listed on the NRHP in New Castle County, Delaware
England Farm, Topeka, Kansas, listed on the NRHP in Shawnee County, Kansas
Isaac England House, Zion, Maryland, listed on the NRHP in Cecil County, Maryland